Combined transport is a form of intermodal transport, which is the movement of goods in one and the same loading unit or road vehicle, using successively two or more modes of transport without handling the goods themselves in changing modes.  Combined transport is intermodal transport where the major part of the journey is by rail, inland waterways or sea, and any initial and/or final legs carried out by road are as short as possible.

See also

 Accompanied combined transport
 Car shuttle train
 Intermodal freight transport
 Multimodal transport
 Ro-ro ferry
 Rolling highway
 Piggyback (transportation)

References

BALLIS, A. & GOLIAS, J. 2004. Towards the improvement of a combined transport chain performance. European Journal of Operational Research, 152, 420–436.

Rail freight transport
Road transport
Water transport
Intermodal transport